Hafiz Assamuddin is a Pakistani politician who was a member of the Provincial Assembly of Khyber Pakhtunkhwa from August 2019 to January 2023.

Political career
Assamuddin contested 2019 Khyber Pakhtunkhwa provincial election on 20 July 2019 from constituency PK-113 (South Waziristan-I) on the ticket of Jamiat Ulema-e-Islam (F). He won the election by the majority of 5,216 votes over the runner up Afsar Khan of Pakistan Tehreek-e-Insaf. He garnered 10,356 votes while Khan received 5,140 votes.

References

Living people
Jamiat Ulema-e-Islam (F) politicians
Politicians from Khyber Pakhtunkhwa
Year of birth missing (living people)